[[File:Joseph Hamilton with radio sodium experiment 97401413.jpeg|thumb|250px|upright|Joseph G. Hamilton was the primary researcher for the human plutonium experiments done at U.C. San Francisco from 1944 to 1947. Hamilton wrote a memo in 1950 discouraging further human experiments because the AEC would be left open "to considerable criticism," since the experiments as proposed had "a little of the Buchenwald touch."<ref name=Sea>"The Media & Me: [The Radiation Story No One Would Touch]", Geoffrey Sea, Columbia Journalism Review, March/April 1994.</ref>]]

Since the discovery of ionizing radiation, a number of human radiation experiments have been performed to understand the effects of ionizing radiation and radioactive contamination on the human body, specifically with the element plutonium.

Experiments performed in the United States
Numerous human radiation experiments have been performed in the United States, many of which were funded by various U.S. government agencies such as the United States Department of Defense, the United States Atomic Energy Commission, and the United States Public Health Service. Experiments including:
 
 feeding radioactive material to mentally disabled children
 enlisting doctors to administer radioactive iron to impoverished pregnant women 
 exposing U.S. soldiers and prisoners to high levels of radiation
 irradiating the testicles of prisoners, which caused severe birth defects
 exhuming bodies from graveyards to test them for radiation (without the consent of the families of the deceased)

On January 15, 1994, President Bill Clinton formed the Advisory Committee on Human Radiation Experiments (ACHRE), chaired by Ruth FadenACHRE homepage, archived of the Johns Hopkins Berman Institute of Bioethics. One of the primary motivating factors behind his decision to create ACHRE was a step taken by his newly appointed Secretary of Energy, Hazel O'Leary, one of whose first actions on taking the helm of the United States Department of Energy was to announce a new openness policy for the department. The new policy led almost immediately to the release of over 1.6 million pages of classified records.

These records made clear that since the 1940s, the Atomic Energy Commission had been sponsoring tests on the effects of radiation on the human body. American citizens who had checked into hospitals for a variety of ailments were secretly injected, without their knowledge, with varying amounts of plutonium and other radioactive materials.

Ebb Cade was an unwilling participant in medical experiments that involved injection of 4.7 micrograms of plutonium on 10 April 1945 at Oak Ridge, Tennessee.Openness, DOE. (June 1998). Human Radiation Experiments: ACHRE Report. Chapter 5: The Manhattan district Experiments; the first injection. Washington, DC. Superintendent of Documents US Government Printing Office. This experiment was under the supervision of Harold Hodge. Most patients thought it was "just another injection," but the secret studies left enough radioactive material in many of the patients' bodies to induce life-threatening conditions.

Such experiments were not limited to hospital patients, but included other populations such as those set out above, e.g., orphans fed irradiated milk, children injected with radioactive materials, prisoners in Washington and Oregon state prisons. Much of the experimentation was carried out in order to assess how the human body metabolizes radioactive materials, information that could be used by the Departments of Energy and Defense in Cold War defense and attack planning.

ACHRE's final report was also a factor in the Department of Energy establishing an Office of Human Radiation Experiments (OHRE) that assured publication of DOE's involvement, by way of its predecessor, the AEC, in Cold War radiation research and experimentation on human subjects. The final report issued by the ACHRE can be found at the Department of Energy's website.

Soviet Union

The Soviet nuclear program involved human experiments on a large scale, including most notably the Totskoye nuclear exercise of 1954 and the experiments conducted at the Semipalatinsk Test Site (1949-1989). As of 1950, there were around 700,000 participants at different levels of the program, half of whom were Gulag prisoners used for radioactivity experiments, as well as the excavation of radioactive ores. Information about the scale, conditions and lethality of those involved in the program is still kept classified by the Russian government and the Rosatom agency.

 Other countries 
In the Marshall Islands, indigenous residents and crewmembers of the fishing boat Lucky Dragon No. 5 were exposed to the high yields of radioactive testing during the Castle Bravo explosions conducted at Bikini Atoll. Researchers subsequently exploited this ostensibly "unexpected" turn of events by conducting research on the onset of effects from radiation poisoning as part of Project 4.1, raising ethical questions as to both the specific incident and the broader phenomenon of testing in populated areas.

Likewise, the Venezuelan geneticist Marcel Roche was implicated in Patrick Tierney's 2000 publication, Darkness in El Dorado, for allegedly administering radioactive iodine to indigenous peoples in the Orinoco basin of Venezuela, such as the Yanomami and Ye'Kwana peoples, in cooperation with the US Atomic Energy Commission (AEC), possibly with no apparent benefit for the test group and without obtaining proper informed consent. This corresponded to similar administrations of iodine-124 by the French anthropologist Jacques Lizot in cooperation with the French Atomic Energy Commission (CEA).

See also

Unethical human experimentation in the United States
Project SUNSHINE
Nuclear and radiation accidents
Radiation poisoning
Radioactive contamination
Human experimentation
Totskoye range nuclear tests
Walter E. Fernald State School
James M. Gates Jr.

Notes and references

 Further reading 

 Killing Our Own: The disaster of America's experience with atomic radiation, by Harvey Wasserman, Delacorte Press, c1992, 
 The Treatment: The Story of Those Who Died in the Cincinnati Radiation Tests, by Martha Stephens, Duke University Press, c2002, Durham, N.C., 
 Bravo for the Marshallese: Regaining Control in a Post-Nuclear, Post-Colonial World'', by Holly M. Barker, Wadsworth, 2004. 
Chair's Perspective on the Work of the Advisory Committee on Human Radiation Experiments by Ruth Faden

External links 
 PROJECT SUNSHINE AND THE SLIPPERY SLOPE
The nuclear bodysnatchers
Grave injustices
"A Little of the Buchenwald Touch": America's Secret Radiation Experiments
Cheryl Welsh, Outlaw nonconsensual human experiments now The Bulletin of the Atomic Scientists, June 16, 2009.
Embassy of the Republic of the Marshall Islands

Radiobiology
Human subject research
Radiation health effects research